Cao Jing (born 1982) is a retired professional wushu taolu athlete from China.

Career 
Cao's first international debut was at the 2003 World Wushu Championships where she was the world champion in women's changquan. Around this time, Cao became the coach of the Shandong Wushu Team. She was then the world champion once again in changquan two years later at the 2005 World Wushu Championships. Later in the same year, she won the gold medal in women's daoshu and gunshu combined at the 2005 National Games of China. She then won gold medals in daoshu at the 2007 World Wushu Championships and the 2008 Asian Wushu Championships. Her last competition was at the 2009 National Games of China and was able to achieve a gold medal victory once again in women's daoshu and gunshu combined.

References

External links 
 Athlete profile at the 2018 Asian Games
 Athlete profile at Shandong Wushu Team

1982 births
Chinese wushu practitioners
Sportspeople from Shandong
Living people